Río Lagartos Municipality (Spanish language: "river of alligators") is one of the 106 municipalities in the Mexican state of Yucatán containing (249.09 km2) of land and is located roughly  northeast of the city of Mérida.

History
There is no accurate data on when the town was founded, but before the conquest, it was part of the chieftainship of Ecab. After colonization, it became the Spanish colony's northeastern port. Before 1580, Antonio Rodríguez convinced the Yucatecan Governor Guillén de las Casas to appoint him as guard of the port. Rodríguez negotiated with the chieftains Chuyubchuen, Kikil, Panabá and Sucopó to provide him with indigenous workers to mine salt, fish or make ashes for soap. He secured almost a monopoly on the native workers requiring any Spaniard wanting to open a new enterprise to negotiate with him to rent workers.

Yucatán declared its independence from the Spanish Crown in 1821, and in 1825 the area was assigned to the Valladolid Municipality. In 1905, it was assigned to the Tizimín Municipality and in 1988 it was confirmed as head of its own municipality.

Governance
The municipal president is elected for a three-year term. The town council has four councilpersons, who serve as Secretary and councilors of health, education, public security and cemeteries.

Communities
The head of the municipality is Río Lagartos, Yucatán. The municipality has 36 populated places besides the seat including Las Coloradas, El Edén, Paraíso, San Pablo, Santa Cruz, Santa Pilar Trejo, Santa Rita, Serrano, Tacxahan, and Zabich. The significant populations are shown below:

Local festivals
Every year on 25 July there is a festival to patron of the town, Saint James the Apostle.

Tourist attractions

 Birding tours
 Cenote Chiquila 
 Cenote Peten Tuchja
 Cenote San Luis Culemix
 Cenote San Manuel
 Cenote  San Pedro
 Cenote  Santa Pilar

References

Municipalities of Yucatán